Berit Opheim Versto (born 18 June 1967 in Voss, Norway) is a Norwegian singer, known for her interpretations of folk music.

Career 
Opheim studied at Bergen Musikkonservatorium (1987–90) and Norges Musikkhøgskole (1990–92), and has worked since 1992 for the Ole Bull Academy in Voss, as well as engagements at NTNU and Norges Musikkhøgskole.

Opheim was the front figure in Orleysa (multiple releases), a soloist in Bergen Domkantori (release in 1990). A recording of kveding (a traditional Norwegian singing style) from Urnes stavkirke resulted in her debut Eitt steg (NorCD, 1996) which won her a Spellemannprisen nomination. A long-held interest in history resulted in the book Solè mi sela (Ole Bull Academy, 1996), a collection of texts from Voss.
She has led the Småkvedarane from Voss to a release (NorCD, 1998) and has also been active in the Voss Spellemannslag. She has also worked on many releases by Utla.

Recently, she has been a soloist with the BIT20 Ensemble on a number of records, won the Landskappleiken, played the role of Månefruva (The Queen of the Night) in a folk music version of The Magic Flute, with the Rikskonsertene (2004) and won the Gammleng-prisen in the folk music category in 2003. In 2005 she performed with «Sullekoppane» (Ole Hamre and Yngve Ådland).  
In the «BNB» trio, she has since 1998 played with the violinist Nils Økland and bassist Bjørn Kjellemyr. They released Ein Song For Dei Utsungne Stunder (2005) with their own compositions.

Opheim was a soloist in the song for Dei nynorske festspela 2006, Ny rørsle by Karl Seglem.
Her other release is Den blide sol (NorCD, 2007) with organist Sigbjørn Apeland recorded at Voss kirke.

Honors 
1992: Landkappleiken winner
1994: Sagaprisen
1995: Landkappleiken winner
1996: Landkappleiken winner
2000: Forbrukersamvirkets kulturpris
2003: Badnajazz-prisen
2004: Landkappleiken winner
2004: Gammleng Award
2005: Statens Kunstnerstipend (2005-06)
2005: Vossajazz-prisen
2006: Soloist in Ny rørsle for Dei nynorske festspela, by Karl Seglem
2007: Commissioned work for Vossajazz Ein engel går stilt

Discography

Solo albums 
1996: Eitt Steg (NorCD), nominated for the Spellemannprisen 1997
2000: Syng, with Småkvedarane frå Voss
2007: Den Blide Sol (NorCD), with Sigbjørn Apeland
2007: Solo-CD med slåttetralling
2007: Per Indrehus/O.H. Hauge, with Dag Arnesen, Bjørn Kjellemyr and Kåre Opheim
2008: Slåttar På Tunga (2L Records), with Dag Arnesen

Collaborations 
1990: Norske Arvestykker, within Bergen Domkantori as soloist
1991: Orleysa, within  Orleysa
1993: Svanshornet, within  Orleysa
1994: Rit (NorCD), with Karl Seglem's Sogn-A-Song
1995: Dåm, with Oslo Kammerkor
1995: Brodd, within Utla
1995: Definitely Pling Plong
1996: Blå Harding, with Nils Økland
1998: Dedicaces, with Gilles Obermayer
1998: Spir (NorCD), with Karl Seglem's Sogn-A-Song
1998: Folketonar frå Hordaland, Reidun Horvei
1998: Fryd (Vossa Jazz Records), with Einar Mjølsnes, Per Jørgensen, Sigbjørn Apeland and Bjørn Kjellemyr
1999: Bergtatt within Oslo Kammerkor, nominated for the Spellemannprisen 2000
2000: Straum, with Nils Økland
2002: Nye Nord, with  Karl Seglem
2003: Skal/Skal Ikkje, with Kvarts
2005: Ein Song For Dei Utsungne Stunder (2L Records), within BNB Trio
2005: Løp, Lokk Og Linjar, with Lasse Thoresen & BIT 20
2008: Fodne Ho Svara Stilt (Heilo catalog|Heilo Records), with Benedicte Maurseth, Åsne Valland Nordli & Kristin Skaare
2009: Draumkvedet, with Karl Seglem

Bibliography 
1995/1996: Solæ mi sela, Collected and transcribed folk songs from Vossabygdene in the book with corresponding tape that the Ole Bull Academy released in 1996. Pictures and history of sources in addition to the music specifications.

References

External links 

Biography at 'Norsk Musikkinformasjon' MIC.no

Norwegian women singers
Norwegian folk singers
Norwegian jazz singers
Norwegian traditional musicians
Heilo Music artists
Norwegian Academy of Music alumni
Musicians from Voss
1967 births
Living people
NorCD artists